Teodo may refer to:

 Tivat, a town and municipality in Montenegro
 , a collier of the Austro-Hungarian Navy
 KK Teodo, a basketball club from Tivat, Montenegro